The Mod Squad is an American crime drama TV series.

The Mod Squad may also refer to:

 The Mod Squad (film), a 1999 American mystery film
The MOD Squad, professional wrestling tag team
 ModSquad, a global digital engagement services company

See also
 Mob Squad (disambiguation)